Bowes Moor is a Site of Special Scientific Interest in the County Durham district in south-west County Durham, England. It is an extensive area of moorland, most of it covered by blanket bog, which supports significant breeding populations of a number of wading birds.

The Pennine Way National Trail passes through the area, as does the A66 road which crosses Bowes Moor using the Stainmore Gap between Bowes and Stainmore. Bowes Moor sits on the river Greta, and has changed very little since Roman times. Many Roman artifacts have been found here over the years, including a Roman aqueduct.

References

Sites of Special Scientific Interest in County Durham
Moorlands of England
Bowes